The Haitian Project, Inc. is a Providence, Rhode Island based Roman Catholic non-profit organization dedicated to education in Haiti. Since 1987, it has operated Louverture Cleary School, a Catholic secondary school in Croix des Bouquets, Haiti.

History 

In 1987, The Haitian Project established Louverture Cleary School, a Catholic boarding school in Croix des Bouquets, Haiti. Brian Moynihan was a benefactor of the school; his brother Patrick became director of it.  Patrick, formerly a commodities trader for Louis Dreyfus Commodities, was president from 1996 until he stepped down on December 31, 2019.

Current activities 

Over 350 secondary students attend the flagship tuition-free boarding school, Louverture Cleary School Santo 5, in Port-au-Prince, with a majority attending universities in Haiti upon graduation.

See also 
 Autonomie project
 List of schools in Haiti

Notes

External links 
 

Child education organizations
Education in Haiti
Haitian-American culture
Charities based in Rhode Island
Organizations based in Providence, Rhode Island
Organizations established in 1987
Foreign charities operating in Haiti
1987 establishments in Rhode Island